Oakdale is a rural locality in the South Burnett Region, Queensland, Australia.

History 
The locality was officially named and bounded on 29 May 1998.

Oakdale State School opened on 10 August 1916 and closed in 1941. It was on the north-east corner of Gessler and Crownthorpe Roads.

References 

South Burnett Region
Localities in Queensland